Construction management (CM) is a professional service that uses specialized, project management techniques and software to oversee the planning, design, construction and closeout of a project. The purpose of construction management is to control the quality of a project's scope, time / delivery and cost—sometimes referred to as a project management triangle or "triple constraints." CM is compatible with all project delivery systems, including design-bid-build, design-build, CM At-Risk and Public Private Partnerships. Professional construction managers may be hired for large to jumbo-scale, high budget undertakings (commercial real estate, transportation infrastructure, industrial facilities, and military infrastructure), called capital projects.

The role of a contractor
Contractors are assigned to a construction project during the design for a constructibility review or once the design has been completed by a licensed architect or a licensed civil engineer. This is done by going through a bidding process with different contractors. As dictated by the project delivery method, the contractor is selected by using one of three common selection methods: low-bid selection, best-value selection, or qualifications-based selection.

A construction manager is hired for the following deliverables means and methods, communications with the authority having jurisdiction, time management, document control cost controls and management, quality controls, decision making, mathematics, shop drawings, record drawings and human resources.

Function 
The functions of construction management typically include the following: 
Specifying project objectives and plans including delineation of scope, budgeting, scheduling, setting performance requirements, and selecting project participants.
Maximizing the resource efficiency through procurement of labor, materials and equipment.
Implementing various operations through proper coordination and control of planning, design, estimating, contracting and construction in the entire process.
Developing effective communications and mechanisms for resolving conflicts.

The Construction Management Association of America (CMAA) states the most common responsibilities of a Construction Manager fall into the following 7 categories: Project Management Planning, Cost Management, Time Management, Quality Management, Contract Administration, Safety Management, and CM Professional Practice. CM professional practice includes specific activities such as defining the responsibilities and management structure of the project management team, organizing and leading by implementing project controls, defining roles and responsibilities, developing communication protocols, and identifying elements of project design and construction likely to give rise to disputes and claims.

Seven types of construction
Agricultural: Typically economical buildings, and other improvements, for agricultural purposes. Examples include barns, equipment and animal sheds, specialized fencing, storage silos and elevators, and water supply and drains such as wells, tanks, and ditches.
Residential: Residential construction includes houses, apartments, townhouses, and other smaller, low-rise housing, small office types. 
Commercial: This refers to construction for the needs of private commerce, trade, and services. Examples include office buildings, "big box" stores, shopping centers and malls, warehouses, banks, theaters, casinos, resorts, golf courses, and larger residential structures such as high-rise hotels and condominiums.
Institutional: This category is for the needs of government and other public organizations. Examples include schools, fire and police stations, libraries, museums, dormitories, research buildings, hospitals, transportation terminals, some military facilities, and governmental buildings.
Industrial: Buildings and other constructed items used for storage and product production, including chemical and power plants, steel mills, oil refineries and platforms, manufacturing plants, pipelines, and seaports.
Heavy civil: The construction of transportation infrastructure such as roads, bridges, railroads, tunnels, airports, and fortified military facilities. Dams are also included, but most other water-related infrastructure is considered environmental.
Environmental: Environmental construction was part of heavy civil but is now separate, dealing with projects that improve the environment. Some examples are water and wastewater treatment plants, sanitary and storm sewers, solid waste management and air pollution control.

Obtaining the project

Bids
A bid is given to the owner by construction managers that are willing to complete their construction project. A bid tells the owner how much money they should expect to pay the construction management company in order for them to complete the project.
Open bid: An open bid is used for public projects. Any and all contractors are allowed to submit their bid due to public advertising.
Closed bid: A closed bid is used for private projects. A selection of contractors are sent an invitation for bid so only they can submit a bid for the specified project.

Selection methods
Low-bid selection: This selection focuses on the price of a project. Multiple construction management companies submit a bid to the owner that is the lowest amount they are willing to do the job for. Then the owner usually chooses the company with the lowest bid to complete the job for them.
Best-value selection: This selection focuses on both the price and qualifications of the contractors submitting bids. This means that the owner chooses the contractor with the best price and the best qualifications. The owner decides by using a request for proposal (RFP), which provides the owner with the contractor's exact form of scheduling and budgeting that the contractor expects to use for the project.
Qualifications-based selection: This selection is used when the owner decides to choose the contractor only on the basis of their qualifications. The owner then uses a request for qualifications (RFQ), which provides the owner with the contractor's experience, management plans, project organization, and budget and schedule performance. The owner may also ask for safety records and individual credentials of their members. This method is most often used when the contractor is hired early during the design process so that the contractor can provide input and cost estimates as the design develops.

Payment contracts
Lump sum: This is the most common type of contract. The construction manager and the owner agree on the overall cost of the construction project and the owner is responsible for paying that amount whether the construction project exceeds or falls below the agreed price of payment.
Cost plus fee: This contract provides payment for the contractor including the total cost of the project as well as a fixed fee or percentage of the total cost. This contract is beneficial to the contractor since any additional costs will be paid for, even though they were unexpected for the owner.
Guaranteed maximum price: This contract is the same as the cost-plus-fee contract although there is a set price that the overall cost and fee do not go above.
Unitprice: This contract is used when the cost cannot be determined ahead of time. The owner provides materials with a specific unit price to limit spending.

Project stages

The stages of a typical construction project have been defined as feasibility, design, construction and operation, each stage relating to the project life cycle.

Feasibility and design
Feasibility and design involves four steps: programming and feasibility, schematic design, design development, and contract documents. It is the responsibility of the design team to ensure that the design meets all building codes and regulations. It is during the design stage that the bidding process takes place.
Conceptual/programming and feasibility: The needs, goals, and objectives must be determined for the building. Decisions must be made on the building size, number of rooms, how the space will be used, and who will be using the space. This must all be considered to begin the actual designing of the building. This phase is normally a written list of each room or space, the critical information about those spaces, and the approximate square footage of each area.
Schematic design: Schematic designs are sketches used to identify spaces, shapes, and patterns. Materials, sizes, colors, and textures must be considered in the sketches. This phase usually involves developing the floor plan, elevations, a site plan, and possibly a few details.
Design development (DD): This step requires research and investigation into what materials and equipment will be used as well as their cost. During this phase, the drawings are refined with information from structural, plumbing, mechanical, and electrical engineers. It also involves a more rigorous evaluation how the applicable building codes will impact the project.
Contract documents (CDs): Contract documents are the final drawings and specifications of the construction project. They are used by contractors to determine their bid while builders use them for the construction process. Contract documents can also be called working drawings.

Pre-construction
The pre-construction stage begins when the owner gives a notice to proceed to the contractor that they have chosen through the bidding process. A notice to proceed is when the owner gives permission to the contractor to begin their work on the project. The first step is to assign the project team which includes the project manager (PM), contract administrator, superintendent, and field engineer.
Project manager: The project manager is in charge of the project team.
Contract administrator: The contract administrator assists the project manager as well as the superintendent with the details of the construction contract.
Superintendent: It is the superintendent's job to make sure everything is on schedule, including the flow of materials, deliveries, and equipment. They are also in charge of coordinating on-site construction activities.
Field engineer: A field engineer is considered an entry-level position and is responsible for paperwork.
During the pre-construction stage, a site investigation must take place. A site investigation takes place to discover if any steps need to be implemented on the job site. This is in order to get the site ready before the actual construction begins. This also includes any unforeseen conditions, such as historical artifacts or environment problems. A soil test must be done to determine if the soil is in good condition to be built upon.

Procurement
The procurement stage is when labor, materials and equipment needed to complete the project are purchased. This can be done by the general contractor if the company does all their own construction work. If the contractor does not do their own work, they obtain it through subcontractors. Subcontractors are contractors who specialize in one particular aspect of the construction work such as concrete, welding, glass, or carpentry. Subcontractors are hired the same way a general contractor would be, which is through the bidding process. Purchase orders are also part of the procurement stage.
Purchase orders: A purchase order is used in various types of businesses. In this case, a purchase order is an agreement between a buyer and seller that the products purchased meet the required specifications for the agreed price.

Construction
The construction stage begins with a pre-construction meeting brought together by the superintendent (on an American project). The pre-construction meeting is meant to make decisions dealing with work hours, material storage, quality control, and site access. The next step is to move everything onto the construction site and set it all up.

A contractor progress payment schedule is a schedule of when (according to project milestones or specified dates) contractors and suppliers will be paid for the current progress of installed work.

Progress payments or interim payments are partial payments for work completed during a portion of a construction period, usually a month. Progress payments are made to general contractors, subcontractors, and suppliers as construction projects progress. Payments are typically made on a monthly basis but could be modified to meet certain milestones. Progress payments are an important part of contract administration for the contractor. Proper preparation of the information necessary for payment processing can help the contractor financially complete the project.

Owner occupancy
Once the owner moves into the building, a warranty period begins. This is to ensure that all materials, equipment, and quality meet the expectations of the owner that are included within the contract.

Issues resulting from construction

Dust and mud
When construction vehicles are driving around a site or moving earth, a lot of dust is created, especially during the dryer months. This may cause disruption for surrounding businesses or homes. A popular method of dust control is to have a water truck driving through the site spraying water on the dry dirt to minimize the movement of dust within and out of the construction site. When water is introduced, mud is created. This mud sticks to the tires of the construction vehicles and is often lead out to the surrounding roads.  A street sweeper may clean the roads to reduce dirty road conditions.

Environmental protections
Storm water pollution: As a result of construction, the soil is displaced from its original location which can possibly cause environmental problems in the future. Runoff can occur during storms which can possibly transfer harmful pollutants through the soil to rivers, lakes, wetlands, and coastal waters. 
Endangered species: If endangered species have been found on the construction site, the site must be shut down for some time. The construction site must be shut down for as long as it takes for authorities to make a decision on the situation. Once the situation has been assessed, the contractor makes the appropriate accommodations to not disturb the species.
Vegetation: There may often be particular trees or other vegetation that must be protected on the job site. This may require fences or security tape to warn builders that they must not be harmed.
Wetlands: The contractor must make accommodations so that erosion and water flow are not affected by construction. Any liquid spills must be maintained due to contaminants that may enter the wetland.
Historical or cultural artifacts: Artifacts may include arrowheads, pottery shards, and bones. All work comes to a halt if any artifacts are found and will not resume until they can be properly examined and removed from the area.

Construction activity documentation
Project meetings take place at scheduled intervals to discuss the progress on the construction site and any concerns or issues. The discussion and any decisions made at the meeting must be documented.

Diaries, logs, and daily field reports keep track of the daily activities on a job site each day.
Diaries: Each member of the project team is expected to keep a project diary. The diary contains summaries of the day's events in the member's own words. They are used to keep track of any daily work activity, conversations, observations, or any other relevant information regarding the construction activities. Diaries can be referred to when disputes arise and a diary happens to contain information connected with the disagreement. Diaries that are handwritten can be used as evidence in court.
Logs: Logs keep track of the regular activities on the job site such as phone logs, transmittal logs, delivery logs, and RFI (Request for Information) logs.
Daily field reports: Daily field reports are a more formal way of recording information on the job site. They contain information that includes the day's activities, temperature and weather conditions, delivered equipment or materials, visitors on the site, and equipment used that day.

Labor statements are required on a daily basis. Also list of Labor, PERT CPM are needed for labor planning to complete a project in time.

Resolving disputes
Mediation: Mediation uses a third party mediator to resolve any disputes. The mediator helps both disputing parties to come to a mutual agreement. This cost-saving process ensures that no attorneys become involved in the dispute and is less time-consuming.
Minitrial: A minitrial takes more time and money than a mediation. The minitrial takes place in an informal setting and involves some type of advisor or attorney that must be paid. The disputing parties may come to an agreement or the third party advisor may offer their advice. The agreement is nonbinding and can be broken. 
Arbitration: Arbitration is the most costly and time-consuming way to resolve a dispute. Each party is represented by an attorney while witnesses and evidence are presented. Once all information is provided on the issue, the arbitrator makes a ruling which provides the final decision. The arbitrator provides the final decision on what must be done and it is a binding agreement between each of the disputing parties.

Study and practice
Construction Management education comes in a variety of formats: formal degree programs (two-year associate degree; four-year baccalaureate degree, master's degree, project management, operations management engineer degree, doctor of philosophy degree, postdoctoral researcher); on-the-job-training; and continuing education and professional development. Information on degree programs is available from ABET, the American Council for Construction Education (ACCE), the American Academy of Project Management (AAPM), the Construction Management Association of America (CMAA) or the Associated Schools of Construction (ASC).
 
According to the American Council for Construction Education (one of the academic accreditation agencies responsible for accrediting construction management programs in the U.S.), the academic field of construction management encompasses a wide range of topics. These range from general management skills, through management skills specifically related to construction, to technical knowledge of construction methods and practices. There are many schools offering Construction Management programs, including some offering a master's degree.

Software

Capital project management software (CPMS) refers to the systems that are currently available that help capital project owner/operators, program managers, and construction managers, control and manage the vast amount of information that capital construction projects create. A collection, or portfolio of projects only makes this a bigger challenge. These systems go by different names: capital project management software, computer construction software, construction management software, project management information systems. Usually construction management can be referred as subset of CPMS where the scope of CPMS is not limited to construction phases of project. Among main construction management software can be mentioned Procore and PlanGrid.

Required knowledge
Construction and building
Technology
Public safety
Customer service
Human resources
Mathematics
Leadership

Business model

The construction industry typically includes three parties: an owner, a licensed designer (architect or engineer) and a builder (usually known as a general contractor). There are traditionally two contracts between these parties as they work together to plan, design and construct the project. The first contract is the owner-designer contract, which involves planning, design, and construction contract administration. The second contract is the owner-contractor contract, which involves construction. An indirect third-party relationship exists between the designer and the contractor, due to these two contracts.

An owner may also contract with a construction project management company as an adviser, creating a third contract relationship in the project. The construction manager's role is to provide construction advice to the designer, design advice to the constructor on the owner's behalf and other advice as necessary.

The construction project manager is sometimes referred to as an “Owner’s Representative.”  The CM’s role is to represent the interests of the Owner throughout the various phases of a project beginning as early as feasibility studies and conceptual planning of the project. Construction Managers help to inform good decision making on behalf of the owner through planning, design, permitting, construction contract procurement, and during construction. A primary role of the CM is to ensure the terms of the Construction Contract are fulfilled by the Contractor. A CM can be an individual or company focused on providing construction management services. A CM typically does not hold the contracts of the project design firms or construction firms but assists or leads the effort on behalf of the Owner to procure those services and ensure successful execution of those contracts’ terms.

A CM firm is typically hired as a personal or professional, qualifications-based service rather than as a bid. Costs are based on a guaranteed maximum price or fixed price, and substantiated by level of effort or staffing plan that identifies the hours per service task to be provided, and based on individual billable hourly rates of proposed project-assigned staff.

Design, bid, build contracts

The phrase "design, bid, build" describes the prevailing model of construction management, in which the general contractor is engaged through a tender process after designs have been completed by the architect or engineer.

Design-build contracts

Many owners – particularly government agencies – let out contracts known as design-build contracts. In this type of contract, the construction team (known as the design-builder) is responsible for taking the owner's concept and completing a detailed design before (following the owner's approval of the design) proceeding with construction. Virtual design and construction technology may be used by contractors to maintain a tight construction time.

There are three main advantages to a design-build contract. First, the construction team is motivated to work with the architect to develop a practical design. The team can find creative ways to reduce construction costs without reducing the function of the final product. The second major advantage involves the schedule. Many projects are commissioned within a tight time frame. Under a traditional contract, construction cannot begin until after the design is finished and the project has been awarded to a bidder. In a design-build contract the contractor is established at the outset, and construction activities can proceed concurrently with the design. The third major advantage is that the design-build contractor has an incentive to keep the combined design and construction costs within the owner's budget. If speed is important, design and construction contracts can be awarded separately; bidding takes place on preliminary plans in a not-to-exceed contract instead of a single firm design-build contract.

The major problem with design-build contracts is an inherent conflict of interest. In a standard contract the architect works for the owner and is directly responsible to the owner. In design-build teaming agreement, the architect works for the design-builder, not the owner, therefore the design-builder may make design and construction decisions that benefit the design-builder, but that may not benefit the owner. During construction, the architect normally acts as the owner's representative. This includes reviewing the builder's work and ensuring that the products and methods meet specifications and codes. The architect's role is compromised when the architect works for the design-builder and not for the owner directly. Thus, the owner may get a building that is over-designed to increase profits for the design-builder, or a building built with lesser-quality products to maximize profits. However, incentive clauses are written into the contract to mitigate these issues.

Planning and scheduling
Project-management methodology is as follows:
Work breakdown structure
Project network of activities
Critical path method (CPM)
Resource management
Resource leveling
Risk assessment

Architecture–engineer
Work inspection
Change orders
Review payments
Materials and samples
Shop drawings
Three-dimensional image

Agency CM
Construction cost management is a fee-based service in which the construction manager (CM) is responsible exclusively to the owner, acting in the owner's interests at every stage of the project. The construction manager offers impartial advice on matters such as:
Optimum use of available funds
Control of the scope of the work
Project scheduling
Optimum use of design and construction firms' skills and talents
Avoidance of delays, changes and disputes
Enhancing project design and construction quality
Optimum flexibility in contracting and procurement
Cash-flow management

Comprehensive management of every stage of the project, beginning with the original concept and project definition, yields the greatest benefit to owners. As time progresses beyond the pre-design phase, the CM's ability to effect cost savings diminishes. The agency CM can represent the owner by helping select the design and construction teams and managing the design (preventing scope creep), helping the owner stay within a predetermined budget with value engineering, cost-benefit analysis and best-value comparisons. The software-application field of construction collaboration technology has been developed to apply information technology to construction management.

CM at-risk
CM at-risk is a delivery method which entails a commitment by the construction manager to deliver the project within a Guaranteed Maximum Price (GMP). The construction manager acts as a consultant to the owner in the development and design phases (preconstruction services), and as a general contractor during construction. When a construction manager is bound to a GMP, the fundamental character of the relationship is changed. In addition to acting in the owner's interest, the construction manager must control construction costs to stay within the GMP.

CM at-risk is a global term referring to the business relationship of a construction contractor, owner and architect (or designer). Typically, a CM at-risk arrangement eliminates a "low-bid" construction project. A GMP agreement is a typical part of the CM-and-owner agreement (comparable to a "low-bid" contract), but with adjustments in responsibility for the CM. The advantage of a CM at-risk arrangement is budget management. Before a project's design is completed (six to eighteen months of coordination between designer and owner), the CM is involved with estimating the cost of constructing a project based on the goals of the designer and owner (design concept) and the project's scope. In balancing the costs, schedule, quality and scope of the project, the design may be modified instead of redesigned; if the owner decides to expand the project, adjustments can be made before pricing. To manage the budget before design is complete and construction crews mobilized, the CM conducts site management and purchases major items to efficiently manage time and cost.

Advantages
CM is working "at risk", therefore have incentive to act in the owner's interest, as well as to efficiently manage construction costs, considering they would be liable for any amount in excess of the GMP
Ability to handle changes in design or scope

Drawbacks
If a cost overrun occurred, it could cost the CM a great deal of money
 The CM is allowed some mistake-related contingency, therefore there is a possibility that they will compensate by reducing the scope of the work to fit the GMP
 Since the GMP is settled before design begins, it is difficult for owners to know whether they received the best possible bid

Bottom line
An at-risk delivery method is best for large projects—both complete construction and renovation—that are not easy to define, have a possibility of changing in scope, or have strict schedule deadlines. Additionally, it is an efficient method in projects containing technical complexity, multi-trade coordination, or multiple phases.

Accelerated construction techniques
Starting with its Accelerated Bridge Program in the late 2000s, the Massachusetts Department of Transportation began employing accelerated construction techniques, in which it signs contracts with incentives for early completion and penalties for late completion, and uses intense construction during longer periods of complete closure to shorten the overall project duration and reduce cost.

See also
 Architectural engineering
 Building officials
 Civil engineering
 Construction engineering
 Construction estimating software
 Cost overrun
 Cost engineering
 Earthquake engineering
 EPC (contract)
 International Building Code
 Quality, cost, delivery - trilemma of project
 Site manager
 Structural engineering
 Work breakdown structure
 Index of construction articles

References

Further reading 

 Halpin, Daniel W., Construction Management, Wiley, Third Edition.
 Rawlinsons Australian Construction Handbook, annual editions

 
Construction
Building engineering
Construction and extraction occupations
Project management by type